The National Institute of Statistics of Rwanda (NISR) is a government-owned agency responsible for collecting, analyzing, archiving and disseminating national statistical data, with the objective of aiding the government of Rwanda in making appropriate, timely, evidence-based national decisions.

Prior to September 2005 it was known as the Direction de la Statistique.

Location
The headquarters of NISR are located on KN2 Avenue, in the Nyarugenge neighborhood of the city of Kigali, Rwanda's capital city. The coordinates of the agency's headquarters are 01°56'29.0"S, 30°03'26.0"E (Latitude:-1.941384; Longitude:30.057225).

Overview
Among its multiple functions, is the task of working with the National Census Commission to process the census data, including the validation, tabulation, dissemination and archiving of the final census data. The last national census was conducted in August 2012. The agency also publishes periodic national economic data for Rwanda.

See also
Economy of Rwanda
Diane Karusisi

References

External links 
Website of National Institute of Statistics of Rwanda

Government of Rwanda
Economy of Rwanda
Organizations established in 2005
2005 establishments in Rwanda
Rwanda
Kigali